Abbeville is a town in Lafayette County, Mississippi. The population was 419 at the 2010 census.

History
Abbeville was originally settled by pioneers from Abbeville, South Carolina in the 1830s.  They lived in apparent peace with the local Chickasaw Indians, whose Chief Toby Tubby owned and operated a ferry along the Memphis-Oxford trade route.

During the American Civil War, Abbeville was almost completely destroyed in the Vicksburg Campaign.

Abbeville post office was established September 28, 1843, with John B. Davis as first postmaster.

In 1950 Abbeville had a population of 275.

Geography

Transportation

Highways
  Mississippi Highway 7

Railroads
 Mississippi Central Railroad

Demographics
As of the census of 2010, there were 419 people and 166 occupied housing units in the town. The racial and ethnic makeup of the town was 89.7% non-Hispanic White, 8.8% African American, 1.0% reporting from two or more races with 0.5% of the population Hispanic or Latino.

Education
The Town of Abbeville is served by the Lafayette County School District.

The University of Mississippi also owns and operates the University of Mississippi Field Station, which is located in Abbeville. It is a natural laboratory used to study, research and teach about sustainable freshwater ecosystems.

Climate
The climate in this area is characterized by hot, humid summers and generally mild to cool winters.  According to the Köppen Climate Classification system, Abbeville has a humid subtropical climate, abbreviated "Cfa" on climate maps.

Notable people
 Carl Craig, state auditor of Mississippi from 1936 to 1940 and from 1948 to 1952 and Mississippi state tax collector from 1940 to 1948
 Jennifer Gillom, former WNBA player
 Peggie Gillom-Granderson, former player in the Women's Professional Basketball League
 L. C. Gordon, first African-American basketball player for the Oklahoma State Cowboys
 Stan Kesler, musician, songwriter, producer
 Shelby McEwen, track and field athlete who competed in the high jump in the 2020 Summer Olympics
 Alexander Preston Shaw, bishop of the Methodist Episcopal Church and the Methodist Church
 Gerald Vaughn, former Canadian Football League defensive back
 Henry Woods, United States district judge of the United States District Court for the Eastern District of Arkansas from 1980 to 2002

References 

Towns in Lafayette County, Mississippi
Towns in Mississippi